Palazzo Spalletti-Trivelli (formerly Guicciardi) is a palace located at Via Emilia A San Pietro #2, corner with Via San Nicolò, in the center of the city of Reggio Emilia, region of Emilia Romagna, Italy. The building now belongs to the Credito Emiliano (Credem) bank, and owns the art collection now in the palace.

History
The building was erected atop ancient Roman ruins, still visible in the basement. A large house or palace was owned by the Bosi Family until 1685. It was rebuilt in the 1700s under the patronage of the new owner Count Guicciardi using designs by the architect Giovanni Maria Ferraroni, and refurbished in the early 1800s in a Neoclassical style by Pietro Marchelli, when the palace was acquired by the Spalletti-Trivelli family, who also owned the adjacent building.

A salon of the piano nobile has a ceiling painting depicting Apollo with the Court of the Hours by Prospero Minghetti, and a ball room with trompe-l'œil colonnades and curtains painted by Vincenzo Carnevali. In addition, the bank houses here its collection of Emilian paintings and Oriental art, viewable by appointment. The painting collection includes the following works;

Madonna and Child by Francesco Raibolini ("Il Francia")
Madonna and Child by Lorenzo Costa
Burial of St Stefano by Lorenzo Sabbatini
Adoration of the Magi by Dionisio Calvart
Annunciation by Dionisio Calvart
Visitation by Scarsellino
Marriage of the Virgin by Scarsellino
Congedo di Cristo dalla Madre by Scarsellino
Adoration of the Magi  by Scarsellino
St Joseph and the Angel by Scarsellino
Peter denying Jesus  by Camillo Procaccini
Death of the Virgin  by Camillo Procaccini
Death of St Paul  by Camillo Procaccini
Coronation of the Virgin by Follower of Annibale Carracci
Moses and the Tables of the Law  by Guido Reni 
Ecce Homo  by Guido Reni 
Magdalen  by follower of Guido Reni 
Salome and the Head of John the Baptist by Leonello Spada
Deposition by Alessandro Tiarini
Salvator Mundi by Alessandro Tiarini
Expulsion of Adam and Eve by Francesco Albani
Madonna della Ghiara di Reggio by Isidoro Bianchi
David with the Head of Goliath by Luca Ferrari, called Luca da Reggio
Salome and the Head of John the Baptist by Luca da Reggio
Miracle of St Antony of Padua by Carlo Francesco Nuvolone
Angelica and Medoro by Simone Cantarini
Bathsheba at the Bath by Antonio Triva
Mary Magdalen by Lorenzo Pasinelli
Judith with the Head of Holofernes by Lorenzo Pasinelli
Interior of Kitchen by Giovanni Domenico Valentino
Interior of a Rigattiere (used goods warehouse) by GD Valentino
St Catherine before Emperor Maximian by Francesco Stringa
Miracle of the Wheel by Francesco Stringa
Lot accompanied by Angels by Marcantonio Franceschini
Lot and Daughters by MA Franceschini
Hunted Game and Rooster by Felice Boselli
Hunted Game and Owl by Felice Boselli
Fish and Seafood by Felice Boselli
Trophy of Hunt and a Dog by Felice Boselli
Diana and a few Amori by Giovanni Gioseffo Dal Sole
Ecstasy of the Magdalen by Gian Gioseffo Dal Sole
Mercury by Giovanni Antonio Burrini
Pastoral scene by Giuseppe Maria Crespi
Still life by Cristoforo Munari
Crowning with thorns attributed to Domenico Maria Viani
Allegory of Experience by Donato Creti
St Sebastian by Marcantonio Ghislina
Satyr and Musical Putti by Federico Bencovich
 Series: Allegories of the Seasons by Girolamo Donnini
Eurydice bitten by Serpent by Girolamo Donnini
Death of Adonis by Girolamo Donnini
Martyrdom of St Paul by Francesco Monti (1719)
After the Battle by Francesco Simonini
Cavalieri in sosta in un paesaggio by Francesco Simonini
Diana and Endymion by Ercole Graziani the Younger
Erminia and Shepherds by E Graziani il Giovane
Rinaldo prevents Armida's Suicide by E Graziani il Giovane
 Series: Hunts with Dogs of Boar, Lynx, Bear, and Bull by Giovanni Crivelli ("il Crivellino")
Joseph and the Wife of Potiphar by 17th century Bolognese painter
St Sebastian by unknown baroque Venetian painter
Allegory of Arts and Virtue by Giovanni Giacomo Sementi
Cimerian Sybil by Guercino
Lot and Daughters by Giovanni Francesco Ferri
St Sebastian by Domenico Pedrini
Blessing of Jacob by Domenico Pedrini
Exile of Hagar by Domenico Pedrini
Joseph and Wife of Potiphar by Filippo Pedrini
Christ and the Samaritan at the Well by follower of MA Franceschini
Birth of Adonis and Abduction of Proserpine by unknown painters

References

Palaces in Reggio Emilia
Neoclassical architecture in Emilia-Romagna
Museums in Emilia-Romagna
Art museums and galleries in Emilia-Romagna